The northwestern wolf (Canis lupus occidentalis), also known as the Mackenzie Valley wolf, Alaskan timber wolf, or Canadian timber wolf, is a subspecies of gray wolf in western North America. Arguably the largest grey wolf subspecies in the world, it ranges from Alaska, the upper Mackenzie River Valley; southward throughout the western Canadian provinces, aside from prairie landscapes in its southern portions, as well as the Northwestern United States.

Taxonomy
This wolf is recognized as a subspecies of Canis lupus in the taxonomic authority Mammal Species of the World (2005). The subspecies was first written of by Scottish naturalist Sir John Richardson in 1829. He chose to give it the name occidentalis in reference to its geographic location rather than label it by its color, as it was too variable to warrant such.

According to one source, phylogenetic analyses of North American gray wolves show that there are three clades corresponding to C. l. occidentalis, C. l. nubilus and C. l. baileyi, each one representing a separate invasion into North America from distinct Eurasian ancestors. C. l. occidentalis, the most northwestern subspecies, is descended from the last gray wolves to colonize North America. It likely crossed into North America through the Bering land bridge after the last ice age, displacing C. l. nubilus populations as it advanced, a process which has continued until present times. Along with C. l. nubilus, C. l. occidentalis is the most widespread member of the five gray wolf subspecies in North America, with at least six different synonyms.

Description
Northwestern wolves are one of the largest subspecies of wolves. In British Columbia, Canada, five adult females averaged 42.5 kg or 93.6 lbs with a range of 85 lbs to 100 lbs (38.6 - 45.4 kg) and ten adult males averaged 112.2 lbs or 51.7 kg with a range of 105 lbs to 135 lbs (47.6 - 61.2 kg), with a weight range for all adults of 38.6 kg to 61.2 kg (85 - 135 lbs).

The Northwestern wolf is also one of the longest wolf subspecies as his length usually ranges from 5 to 6 ft, and it can also reach as long as 7 ft (213 cm).

Sir John Richardson described the northwestern wolf as having a more robust build than the Eurasian wolf, with a larger, rounder head and a thicker, more obtuse muzzle. Its ears are also shorter, and its fur bushier.

Reintroduction

In Yellowstone National Park, artificially relocated northwestern wolves have been well-documented feeding on elk. They usually stampede the herd using pack teamwork to separate the younger elk from the adults. They also will charge young calves separated from their parents. Winter-weakened or sick elk also play an important part of Yellowstone wolf diets, and it is estimated that over 50 percent of winter-weakened or sick elk in Yellowstone are killed by wolves. Of these, about 12 percent of carcasses were scavenged by other predators, including ravens, bald eagles, black bears, grizzly bears, and coyotes. In the same national park, wolves also prey on bison, though such attacks usually involve sick animals or calves because healthy, adult bison can easily kill wolves with their hooves.

Wolves are present in Canadian and British safari parks including Longleat, Woburn,  and Parc Omega.

References

External links

Subspecies of Canis lupus
Carnivorans of North America
Mammals of Canada
Mammals of the United States
Wolves in the United States
Fauna of the Northwestern United States
Fauna of Alaska
Mammals described in 1829